Striginiana camerunica is a moth in the family Eupterotidae. It was described by Per Olof Christopher Aurivillius in 1893. It is found in Cameroon and in Orientale Province of the Democratic Republic of the Congo.

References

Moths described in 1893
Janinae